Flax sanchristobali is a moth of the family Erebidae first described by Michael Fibiger in 2011. It is found on the Solomon Islands (it was described from central Makira).

The wingspan is 9-9.5 mm. The forewings are beige, with brown subterminal and terminal areas. The base of the costa and costal quadrangular medial area are also brown. There is a dark-brown dot in the inner lower area and four dark-brown subapical costal dots. The crosslines are mostly light brown, although the subterminal line is brown and the terminal line is only indicated by dark-brown interveinal dots. The hindwings are light grey. The underside of the forewings is unicolorous brown and the underside of the hindwings is grey with a discal spot.

References

Micronoctuini
Moths described in 2011
Taxa named by Michael Fibiger